Idris Davies (6 January 1905 – 6 April 1953) was a Welsh poet. Born in Rhymney, near Merthyr Tydfil in South Wales, he became a poet, originally writing in Welsh, but later writing exclusively in English.

He was the only poet to cover significant events of the early 20th century in the South Wales Valleys and the South Wales Coalfield, and from a perspective literally at the coalface. He is now best known for the verses "Bells of Rhymney", from his 1938 Gwalia Deserta (meaning literally "Wasteland of Wales"), which were later adapted into a popular folk song.

Life and career

Davies was born at 16 Field Street, Rhymney, Monmouthshire, the Welsh-speaking son of colliery chief winderman (mine lift operator) Evan Davies and his wife Elizabeth Ann. After leaving the local school at the age of fourteen, for the next seven years Davies worked underground as a miner in the nearby McLaren Pit at Abertysswg and later at the Maerdy Pit, Pontlottyn. After an accident in which he lost a finger at the coalface, and active participation in the General Strike of 1926, the pit closed and he became unemployed. He spent the next four years following what he called "the long and lonely self-tuition game", having been introduced to the work of Shelley by a fellow miner.

He qualified as a teacher through courses at Loughborough College and the University of Nottingham. During the Second World War he took teaching posts at various schools in London, where he became friends with Dylan Thomas. Before his first book was published in 1938, Davies' work appeared in the Western Mail, the Merthyr Express, the Daily Herald, the Left Review and Comment (a weekly periodical of poetry, criticism and short stories, edited by Victor Neuburg and Sheila Macleod).

In 1947 he returned to teach at a school in the Rhymney Valley. The poems for his second anthology, published by Faber and Faber in 1945, were chosen by T. S. Eliot. Eliot thought that Davies' poems had a claim to permanence, describing them as "the best poetic document I know about a particular epoch in a particular place".

His final volume, Selected Poems, was published shortly before his death. Around this time Dylan Thomas wrote Davies a surprisingly touching letter. Thomas had read "Bells of Rhymney" as part of a St. David's Day radio broadcast, but told Davies that he did not feel the poem was particularly representative of Davies' work, as it was "not angry enough".

Death and legacy

Davies died from abdominal cancer, aged 48, at his mother's house at 7, Victoria Road, Rhymney on Easter Monday, 6 April 1953. He was buried in Rhymney Public Cemetery. There are memorial plaques to Davies at Victoria Road and at the town library.

After his death over two hundred of his manuscript poems and a short verse-play, together with the typescripts of his comprehensive wartime diaries, were deposited at the National Library of Wales at Aberystwyth. Later, more of his unpublished poems and most of his prose – an unfinished novel, essays, lecture notes and some of his letters – were found. Some of this later material appeared posthumously in The Collected Poems of Idris Davies (1972); Idris Davies (1972), and Argo Record No. ZPL.1181: Idris Davies (1972).

There is a modern memorial sculpture for Davies in Rhymney, with an inscription reading "When April came to Rhymney with shower and sun and shower" – the opening line of his poem "Rhymney".

In September 2006 a refurbished grave memorial was unveiled, at a re-dedication service, in the town's cemetery.

Views

The editor's frontispiece from Gwalia Deserta provides a useful summary of Davies' outlook.

In a diary entry Davies wrote: "I am a socialist. That is why I want as much beauty as possible in our everyday lives, and so I am an enemy of pseudo-poetry and pseudo-art of all kinds. Too many 'poets of the Left', as they call themselves, are badly in need of instruction as to the difference between poetry and propaganda ... These people should read William Blake on Imagination until they show signs of understanding him. Then the air will be clear again, and the land be, if not full of, fit for song."

Work 

Davies' first published volume was the 1938 extended poetical work Gwalia Deserta. The verses it contained were inspired partly by such mining disasters as that at Marine Colliery at Cwm near Ebbw Vale in 1927, and by the failure of the 1926 UK General Strike, the Great Depression in the United Kingdom and their combined effects on the South Wales valleys.

The "Bells of Rhymney" verses, perhaps Davies' most widely known work, appear as Part XV of the book. The stanzas follow the pattern of the well known nursery rhyme "Oranges and Lemons". In the late 1950s the verses were adapted into a folk song by Pete Seeger and became a folk rock standard. The song, entitled "The Bells of Rhymney", has been covered by many others since. More recently some of the other stanzas from Davies' Gwalia Deserta have also been set to music by Welsh performer Max Boyce as the song "When We Walked to Merthyr Tydfil in the Moonlight Long Ago".

In February 2010 Davies' work was mentioned, by Conservative MP David Davies and Plaid Cymru MP Hywel Williams, in a Parliamentary debate concerning health-care in Wales.

The 2017 album Every Valley, by London-based alternative band Public Service Broadcasting, includes a version of Gwalia Deserta XXXVI set to music and re-titled Turn No More. It is sung by Manic Street Preachers' singer James Dean Bradfield.

List of works
In Davies' own lifetime:
Gwalia Deserta (literally Wasteland of Wales) (1938) Dent
The Angry Summer: A Poem of 1926 (1943) Faber and Faber
Tonypandy and other poems (1945) Faber and Faber
Selected Poems (1953) Faber and Faber

Published posthumously: 
Collected Poems (1972) Gomer Press
Complete Poems (1994) ed. Dafydd Johnston, University of Wales Press
A Carol for the Coalfield and other poems (2002) Gwasg Carreg Gwalch

See also
Anglo-Welsh poetry

References

External links
 The poem and song The Bells of Rhymney
 Dictionary of Welsh Biography on Idris Davies
 BBC Wales feature on "The Bells of Rhymney"
 .
 Pens which belonged to the poet Idris Davies at education.gtj.org

1905 births
1953 deaths
Anglo-Welsh poets
Alumni of the University of Nottingham
People from Rhymney
Welsh miners
20th-century Welsh poets
Welsh-speaking writers
Proletarian literature
Deaths from cancer in Wales